My Name is Bandu is a 2015 Sri Lankan Sinhala comedy, family film directed by Suranga de Alwis and produced by Suranga de Alwis. It stars Bandu Samarasinghe, and Anusha Damayanthi in lead roles along with Rodney Warnakula, Roy de Silva and Mark Samson. Music for the film is done by Sarath de Alwis. The film is the 85th film of Bandu Samarasinghe. It is the 1239th Sri Lankan film in the Sinhala cinema.

Plot

Cast
 Bandu Samarasinghe as Bandula / Saliya 
 Anusha Damayanthi as Sanju
 Rodney Warnakula as Raju
 Ariyasena Gamage as Dhanasiri Mudalali 
 Roy de Silva as Sinhabahu Abeywardena
 Mark Samson as Assistant
 Ronnie Leitch as OIC
 Premadasa Vithanage as Martin Kapuwa
 Vishwa Lanka as Vishwa
 Denuwan Senadhi as Punyasoma / Pusa
 Rashmi Sumanasekara as Anju
 Upali Keerthisena as Naattami
 D.B. Gangodathenna as Municipal tractor driver
 Damitha Saluwadana

Soundtrack

Distribution
The film successfully screened in E.A.P circuit cinemas from its distribution date in Colombo. It was screened more than 150 days in many cinemas.

References

External links
 මුව පුරාම සිනා කැන්දූ – හැදෙයි මෙලෙස

2015 films
2010s Sinhala-language films
Films directed by Suranga de Alwis